Vice Admiral Zahir Uddin Ahmed, (ND), NBP, BCGM, ndc, psc (born 1957) was Chief of Naval Staff of the Bangladesh Navy. He was preceded by Vice Admiral Sarwar Jahan Nizam ndu, psc, BN and succeeded by Vice Admiral M Farid Habib, ndc, psc, BN

Naval commands
As a successful navigator, Admiral Zahir commanded almost all kinds of ships and establishments during his long naval service. He was the first Commanding Officer of BN's modern frigate BNS Bangabandhu. He also commanded BN frigates , BNS Abu Bakr. He served as Commodore Commanding BN Flotilla (COMBAN) and as Commodore Commanding Chittagong (COMCHIT) to command BN fleet and Chittagong area command respectively. In addition he performed the duty of Commandant, Bangladesh Marine Academy and Director General of the Bangladesh Coast Guard.

Zahir Uddin Ahmed appointed as Chief of the Naval Staff of Bangladesh Navy on 26 January 2009 and assume the office of the Chief of the Naval Staff on 29 January 2009. He was promoted to the rank of Vice Admiral on 3 October 2009.

Recognition
Admiral Zahir received Chief of the Naval Staff (CNS) commendation for his remarkable performance in naval service. He is also awarded with the highest achievement awards namely 'Bangladesh Navy Medal' and 'Bangladesh Coast Guard Medal' for outstanding contribution in different fields of Navy and Coast Guard.

Personal life
Admiral Zahir is married to Shabnam Ahmed. They have a son and a daughter together.

See also
Military of Bangladesh

References

|-

Living people
1957 births
Bangladeshi Navy admirals
Director Generals of Bangladesh Coast Guard
Chiefs of Naval Staff (Bangladesh)
People from Gazipur District